Manellore is a village in the Tiruvallur district of Tamil Nadu, India. It is located in the Gummidipoondi taluk.

It was  formerly known as Manyalavur. Manellore's economy has a broad agriculture & handloom base.

Demographics
According to the 2011 census of India, Manellore has 1203 households. The effective literacy rate (i.e. the literacy rate of population excluding children aged 6 and below) is 74.2%.

Transport

Distance from major places:
 Madharpakkam - 02 km
 Gummidipoondi - 16 km
 Kavaraipettai - 22 km
 Uthukottai - 22 km
 Ponneri - 38 km
 Chennai - 58 km (Road)
 Kanyakumari - 824 km (Railway)
 Gudalur (via Connoor)- 718 km (Road)
 Rameshwaram - 739 km (Railway)
 Madurai - 548 km
 Coimbatore - 562 km

Andhra Pradesh
 Satyavedu - 6 km
 Sullerpet - 35 km
 Srikalahasti - 63 km
 Puttur - 63 km
 Tirupati - 103 km

Education
Primary schools:
 Panchayat Union Primary School
 CSI Primary School
 RMT Matriculation School.

Secondary schools:
 Govt.Hr.Sec School - Manellore
 Govt.Girls.High School - Manellore.

Key Members
 Counselor - P.S.Gunasekar
 President - M.Lawrance

References 

Villages in Gummidipoondi taluk